The Final Album: The Ultimate Best Of is a greatest hits album by German duo Modern Talking, released on 23 June 2003 by Hansa Records. It consists of singles released from 1984 to 2003.

Track listing

Notes
  signifies a co-producer

Personnel
 Dieter Bohlen – production, arrangements
 Luis Rodríguez – co-production 
 Axel Breitung – co-production 
 Thorsten Brötzmann – co-production 
 Manfred Esser, Wolfgang Wilde, Stephan Pick, Fryderyk Gabowicz – photos
 Ronald Reinsberg – artwork

Charts

Weekly charts

Year-end charts

Certifications

References

2003 greatest hits albums
Bertelsmann Music Group compilation albums
Hansa Records compilation albums
Modern Talking albums